The Battle of Opole took place in the Polish town of Opole, in early April 1241, during the Mongol invasion of Poland. It ended in the victory of the Mongol forces, who defeated knights from Opole Silesia and Lesser Poland, headed by Duke Wladyslaw Opolski.

In late March 1241, Mongol forces, which had previously been divided into two armies, reunited in the area of Kraków. On 1 April the invaders headed westwards, to the Polish province of Silesia. After a skirmish near Raciborz, the Mongols decided not to besiege well-fortified Raciborz. Instead, they followed the Oder towards Opole. There, they faced units from Lesser Poland (the provinces of Kraków and Sandomierz), reinforced with knights of Duke of Opole, Wladyslaw. Since the Poles were numerically inferior, they retreated after a short battle. The Mongols followed them towards Wrocław, and Legnica (see Battle of Legnica).

Sources 
 Piastowie. Leksykon biograficzny, wyd. 1999, str. 397
	Wielka Historia Polski cz. do 1320, wyd. Pinexx 1999, s. 187-188
	Stanislaw Krakowski, Polska w walce z najazdami tatarskimi w XIII wieku, wyd. MON 1956, str.136-137

1241 in Europe
Opole
History of Opole
Opole
Opole